Scarites guineensis is a species of ground beetle in the family Carabidae. It is found in West Africa, including Mali.

References

Scarites
Beetles described in 1831